Babay Luy-e Janan Lu (also Romanized as Bābāy Lūy-e Jānān Lū; also known as Bābāylū and Bābāy Lū) is a village in Minjavan-e Sharqi Rural District, Minjavan District, Khoda Afarin County, East Azerbaijan Province, Iran. At the 2006 census, its population was 173, in 36 families.

References 

Populated places in Khoda Afarin County